Ken Bantum (born March 16, 1935) is an American athlete. He competed in the men's shot put at the 1956 Summer Olympics.

References

External links
 

1935 births
Living people
Athletes (track and field) at the 1956 Summer Olympics
American male shot putters
Olympic track and field athletes of the United States
Place of birth missing (living people)